Myron Samuel (born 19 December 1992) is a Vincentian international footballer who last played for Seattle Sounders FC 2 in the USL. Samuel is one of the youngest players to play and to score for Saint Vincent and the Grenadines.

Club career
Samuel played for Vincentian NLA Premier League clubs System 3 FC in 2009 and Avenues United FC from 2009 to 2013, and Rendezvous FC of the Barbados Premier Division from 2013 to 2015. He scored 14 goals in 2013, 25 goals in 2014, and 12 goals in 2015.  On 7 June 2011, Samuel appeared in a reserve match for American side Seattle Sounders FC. On 18 August 2015, it was announced that he had returned to Seattle and signed for its reserve team in the United Soccer League, Seattle Sounders FC 2. He joined his national team strike partner Oalex Anderson and fellow Vincentian and Seattle manager Ezra Hendrickson who brought him to Seattle during his first stint in 2011. The next day, Samuel made his debut for the club, coming on as a second-half substitute. He went on to score two goals in the match, including the game-winner, as Seattle won 3–2 over the Colorado Springs Switchbacks FC. It was later revealed that Samuel had broken his foot in the same match and had undergone successful surgery and was undergoing rehabilitation. The player was expected to be out for 10 weeks, missing the remaining six games of the season, and possibly longer.

On 4 December 2015, it was announced that Samuel would return to S2 for the 2016 USL season, along with international teammate Oalex Anderson.

International career
Samuel made his senior debut for Saint Vincent and the Grenadines in 2008 at the age of 18 during 2008 Caribbean Cup qualification. Samuel won the Golden Boot as top scorer during the 2015 Windward Islands Tournament with four goals and three matches as Saint Vincent and the Grenadines were crowned champions of the tournament for the first time.

International goals
Scores and results list Saint Vincent and the Grenadines' goal tally first.

Personal life
He is the cousin of fellow Vincentian international footballer Shandel Samuel. He was arrested in June 2021 in St. Vincent for weapons possession.

References

External links

Caribbean Football Database profile

1992 births
Living people
Saint Vincent and the Grenadines footballers
Saint Vincent and the Grenadines international footballers
Saint Vincent and the Grenadines under-20 international footballers
Saint Vincent and the Grenadines youth international footballers
Association football forwards
Saint Vincent and the Grenadines expatriate footballers
Avenues United FC players
Tacoma Defiance players
Expatriate soccer players in the United States
USL Championship players
Saint Vincent and the Grenadines expatriate sportspeople in the United States
People from Saint Andrew Parish, Saint Vincent and the Grenadines
Rendezvous FC players